The Prix du roman arabe of the "Council of Arab Ambassadors" is a French literary award established in 2008. 

Its aim is to "reward a work of high literary value as well as consolidate the intercultural dialogue between the Arab world and France by putting forward Arabic literature translated or written directly in French." Placed under the aegis of the Council of Arab Ambassadors in France in partnership with the Institut du monde arabe, it is endowed with a sum of 15000 euros.

In June 2012, Boualem Sansal received this award for his book Rue Darwin against the opposition of the Arab ambassadors who finance it due to Sansal's visit to Israel to speak at the Jerusalem Writers Festival. This disavowal resulted in the resignation of the jury member

Jury 
The award was launched with the following members of the jury:
 Hélène Carrère d'Encausse of the Académie française, honorary president
 Dominique Baudis, then director of the Institut du monde arabe
 Hélé Béji
 Tahar Ben Jelloun
 Pierre Brunel
 Paule Constant
 Paula Jacques
 Christine Jordis
 Vénus Khoury-Ghata
 Alexandre Najjar
 Olivier Poivre d'Arvor
 Danièle Sallenave
 Elias Sanbar

Laureates 
 2008: Elias Khoury for Comme si elle dormait, translated by Rania Samara, Actes Sud
 2009: Gamal Ghitany for Les Poussières de l'effacement, translated by Khaled Osman, Éditions du Seuil
 2010: Rachid Boudjedra for Les Figuiers de Barbarie, éd. Grasset and Mahi Binebine for Les Étoiles de Sidi Moumen, Flammarion
 2011: Hanan al-Shaykh for Toute une histoire, translated by Stéphanie Dujols, Actes Sud.
 2012: Boualem Sansal for Rue Darwin, Éditions Gallimard

References

External links 
 La tragicomédie du prix du Roman arabe on France Culture

Roman arabe
Awards established in 2008
2008 establishments in France